Camille Patha is a visual artist  who lives and works in Seattle, Washington. She was born in 1938 in Seattle, Washington and moved with her family to West Seattle in 1945. She moved to Arizona and studied at Arizona State University from 1956 to 1958, then returned to Seattle. In 1960, she graduated from the University of Washington with a Bachelor of Arts degree in fine arts, and in 1965 was awarded a Master of Fine Arts degree by the University of Washington Graduate School of Art. Her work has gone through several stages including Surrealism, Protofeminism, Ecologist and Modernist. Patha's work explores color consistently, even though her styles and interests in modern art may alter.

Patha has been present in the art world all throughout her life. Her art brings an original outlook on abstract expressionism and surrealism.

Patha's largest show 'A Punch of Color: Fifty Years of Painting' was held in 2014 at the Tacoma Art Museum.

Since 2015 Patha's work has been displayed in American Embassies through the U.S. Department of State Art in Embassies Program.

References
 
Kangas, Matthew (2006) "Camille Patha, Geography of Desire"
https://www.camillepatha.com/bio.html
"Camille Patha Delivers Punch of Color to Tam", TAM (Tacoma Art Museum). Web. 14 Jan. 2014
http://www.tacomaartmuseum.org/camille-patha-delivers-punch-color-tam/
"Camille Patha"
https://art.state.gov/personnel/camille_patha/

1938 births
Living people
American women artists
University of Washington School of Art + Art History + Design alumni
Arizona State University alumni
Artists from Seattle
21st-century American women